Ramón Muller (16 April 1935 – 12 May 1986) was an Argentine football striker who played in France with FC Sochaux, RC Strasbourg, FC Nantes and Stade Briochin.
 His son was Oscar Muller.

References

External links
Profile at racingstub

1935 births
1986 deaths
Footballers from Rosario, Santa Fe
Argentine footballers
Argentine expatriate footballers
Newell's Old Boys footballers
FC Sochaux-Montbéliard players
RC Strasbourg Alsace players
FC Nantes players
US Boulogne players
Stade Briochin players
Ligue 1 players
Ligue 2 players
Expatriate footballers in France
Argentine expatriate sportspeople in France
Argentine people of German descent
Argentine football managers
US Boulogne managers
Expatriate football managers in France
Association football forwards